"The Wreck of the Edmund Fitzgerald is a 1976 hit song written, composed and performed by Canadian singer-songwriter Gordon Lightfoot to commemorate the sinking of the bulk carrier SS Edmund Fitzgerald on Lake Superior on November 10, 1975. Lightfoot drew his inspiration from Newsweek article on the event, "The Cruelest Month", which it published in its November 24, 1975, issue.  Lightfoot considers this song to be his finest work.

Appearing originally on Lightfoot's 1976 album Summertime Dream, the single version hit number 1 in his native Canada (in the RPM national singles survey) on November 20, 1976, barely a year after the disaster. In the United States, it reached number 1 in Cashbox and number 2 for two weeks in the Billboard Hot 100 (behind Rod Stewart's "Tonight's the Night"), making it Lightfoot's second-most-successful single, behind only "Sundown". Overseas it was at best a minor hit, peaking at number 40 in the UK Singles Chart.

Lightfoot re-recorded the song in 1988 for the compilation album Gord's Gold, Vol. 2.

Lyrics
The song contains a few artistic omissions and paraphrases. In a later interview aired on Canadian commercial radio, Lightfoot recounted how he had agonised over possible inaccuracies while trying to pen the lyrics  until Lenny Waronker, his long-time producer and friend, finally removed his writer's block simply by advising him to play to his artistic strengths and "just tell a story". Lightfoot's passion for recreational sailing on the Great Lakes informs his ballad's verses throughout.

Deviations from the facts of the incident include:

 According to the song, Edmund Fitzgerald was bound "fully loaded for Cleveland". In fact, the ship was heading for Zug Island, near Detroit, where it was set to discharge its cargo of taconite iron ore pellets before heading on to Cleveland, her home port, to wait out the winter.
 The Edmund Fitzgerald was not "coming back from some mill in Wisconsin." Lake freighters that carry bulk iron ore are loaded at ore docks, not mills.
 Capt. Ernest McSorley had stated in his last radio transmission before the ship sank that he and the crew were "holding our own", not as the lyrics of the song quote that they had "water coming in," although he did communicate the ship was taking on water several hours earlier.
 The song mentions several of the possible causes of sinking, and while there is still debate about the cause, exploration of the wreckage found the bow and stern relatively close to each other on the lakebed floor, ruling out that it "might have split up."   However this exploration took place a significant amount of time after the writing of the song. 
 In his lyrics Lightfoot employs poetic licence to describe the Mariners' Church of Detroit as "The Maritime Sailors' Cathedral".
 In a later live recording, Lightfoot recounts that a parishioner of the church informed him that the church is not "musty". From that time on, instead of singing "In a musty old hall...", he now sang "In a rustic old hall..."
 In March 2010, Lightfoot changed a line during live performances to reflect new findings that there had been no crew error involved in the sinking. The line originally read, "At 7 p.m. a main hatchway caved in; he said..."; Lightfoot  now sings it as "At 7 p.m. it grew dark, it was then he said...". Lightfoot learned about the new research when contacted for permission to use his song for a History Channel documentary that aired on March 31, 2010. Lightfoot stated that he had no intention of changing the original copyrighted lyrics; instead, from then on, he has simply sung the new words during live performances.

Chart performance

Weekly charts

Year-end charts

Production
The song was recorded in December 1975 at Eastern Sound, a recording studio composed of two Victorian houses at 48 Yorkville Avenue in a then-hippie district of downtown Toronto. The famous studio, which also recorded Rush, Cat Stevens, Bruce Springsteen and Jimi Hendrix, was later torn down and replaced by a parking lot.

Pee Wee Charles and Terry Clements came up with "the haunting guitar and steel riffs" on a "second take" during the evening session.

Lightfoot cleared the studio and killed all the lights save the one illuminating his parchment of scribbled words when recording his vocal part.

Parodies
During the 1984 United States presidential election, the comedian troupe Capitol Steps performed  a parody of the song changing the ship's name to Walter 'Fritz' Mondale.

See also

 Canadian rock
 Music of Canada

References

External links
 Lyrics from gordonlightfoot.com
 Column by Mark Steyn—"Of Rain and Wrecks"—Song of the Week #338

1976 singles
1976 songs
1970s ballads
Cashbox number-one singles
Gordon Lightfoot songs
Maritime music
Reprise Records singles
Rock ballads
RPM Top Singles number-one singles
Song recordings produced by Lenny Waronker
Songs based on American history
Songs based on Canadian history
Songs written by Gordon Lightfoot
Vehicle wreck ballads